The Sumba–Flores languages, which correspond to the traditional "Bima–Sumba" subgroup minus Bima, are a proposed group of Austronesian languages (geographically Central–Eastern Malayo-Polynesian languages) spoken on and around the islands of Sumba and western–central Flores in the Lesser Sundas, Indonesia. The main languages are Manggarai, which has half a million speakers on the western third of Flores, and Kambera, with a quarter million speakers on the eastern half of Sumba Island.

The Hawu language of Savu Island is suspected of having a non-Austronesian substratum, but perhaps not to any greater extent than the languages of central and eastern Flores, such as Sika, or indeed of Central Malayo-Polynesian languages in general.

Classification
Blust (2008) finds moderate support for linking the languages of western and central Flores with Sumba–Hawu.

Sumba–Flores
Sumba–Hawu
Hawu–Dhao
Sumba languages (see)
Western Flores
Manggarai–Rembong: Komodo, Manggarai, Riung, Rembong, Rajong, Kepo', Wae Rana
Central Flores–Palu'e
Palu'e
Central Flores
Ende–Lio: a dialect cluster of Ende, Lio, Nage, Ke'o
Ngada: Ngad'a, Rongga, So'a (dialect cluster)

See also
Sumba languages
Central Flores languages

References

Further reading
Gasser, Emily. 2014. Subgrouping in Nusa Tenggara: The case of Bima-Sumba. In Jeffrey Connor-Linton and Luke Wander Amoroso (eds.), Measured Language: Quantitative Studies of Acquisition, Assessment, and Variation, 63-78. Washington, DC: Georgetown University Press.

External links
LexiRumah (part of the Lesser Sunda linguistic databases)
Reconstructing the past through languages of the present: the Lesser Sunda Islands

Languages of Indonesia
Sumba languages
Flores Island (Indonesia)